Henry Edward Cusack, or Edward Cusack as he was more commonly known, was a Locomotive Superintendent of the Midland Great Western Railway (MGWR).

Life 

Edward Cusack was born on 6 November 1865. He was educated at Clifton College, Bristol, England. His father, Sir Ralph Smith Cusack was Chairman of the MGWR from 1865 to 1905 and his brother-in-law, Major Major James William Henry Claud "H.C." Cusack was Deputy Chairman of the MGWR from 1905. His mother was Elizabeth Barker He served a four-year apprenticeship with Kitson and Company, England, followed by two years at Crewe, then returned to Ireland as a junior draughtsman in 1890. He married Constance Louisa Vernon in 1892. When Martin Atock announced his intended retirement from the MGWR Henry Edward Cusack was appointed his joint first assistant locomotive engineer with Basil Hope from the North Eastern Railway. Martin Atock's son, Thomas, was appointed as second assistant. Cusack rose to take the Chief Mechanical Engineers position from 1905-1915 and was replaced by the young draughtsman W. H. Morton who rose to support him.

Engineering 

Cusack oversaw the introduction of MGWR Class D on the transition from his predecessor Martin Atock. The first attributed locomotive to his era was the MGWR Class A, the largest 4-4-0 in Ireland at the time of its introduction in 1902. The smaller MGWR Class C 4-4-0 followed from 1909. His era also saw the MGWR Class B goods 0-6-0, an attempt at a larger freight engine.  It is generally noted W. H. Morton is likely to have assisted Cusack with practical design input.

Cusack was responsible for the design of a Royal Train prepared for the visit of King Edward VII and Queen Alexandra in 1903 with a12 wheel saloon reputed to be the most luxurious in Ireland. As well as 6-wheel carriages he also designed the coaches for the MGWR "limited mail" express train in 1900.  His coach designs typically had a distinct roof profile, somewhat flat for most of the top but tightly curved at the sides.

References 

1865 births
1954 deaths
Locomotive builders and designers
Midland Great Western Railway
Irish civil engineers
Irish people in rail transport
Locomotive superintendents
Irish railway mechanical engineers
20th-century Irish engineers
19th-century Irish engineers